Michael Bizwick Usi  is a Malawian Politician, he is the current Minister of Tourism, Culture & Wildlife in Malawi.  Michael Usi is also a movie actor, playwright, politician, and musician. As an actor, he is most famously known for his role as "Dr. Manga" in the film Dr. Manga. He is also the director of the MBC TV series Tikuferanji (Why Are We Dying).

Personal life
Born in 1968.  He attended Mulanje Secondary School. He once worked for Adventist Development and Relief Agency (ADRA).

Marriage life 
He is married to Ella, a now retired nurse who, before retiring was working at Blantyre Adventist Hospital.

Career
In the absence of national TV in Malawi, he gained his popularity by acting on radio plays on MBC Radio 1 in Malawi. He then began making feature films. His works comment on topical issues in Malawi and reflect the social and political realities of Malawian life.

Usi is involved in trying to build the film industry in Malawi and constantly advocates for the growth of the industry in Malawi. In 2010 he made an appearance at the MWA (Malawi Washington Association) Extravaganza 2010 Panel discussion hosted by the MWA at the Malawian Embassy in Washington DC where he discussed the history of the Malawian Film industry and his ideas on its expansion.

The focus of his PhD, which he gained from the University of Bedfordshire in about 2015, is on youth engagement in developing their country. His research involved review of youth engagement strategies in many countries.

On 6 February 2019, United Transformation Movement (UTM) Party leader Saulos Klaus Chilima unveiled Michael Usi as his running mate for May 21 tripartite elections.

On 8 July 2020, Michael Usi was appointed Minister of Tourism, Wildlife and Culture of the Republic of Malawi in the cabinet of President Lazarus Chakwera.

Works

Films
 Dr Manga – Comedy about a Malawian Houseboy, Dr. Manganya.
 Manganya in Action
 Living on Perfume (2009) – Filmed on location in Malawi and Burundi, the film details the conditions in Malawian prisons and the Malawian penal system. It also comments on politics and love throughout its four episodes. It features an international cast of Australian, British, Malawian and Swedish actors. Local artists featured are Ruth Simika, Augustine Mauwa, Deus Sandramu, and Gift Namachekecha.
 International Cook
 Watch Out (2010) – Filmed in location in the Washington DC metro area, this film is the story of the experiences of a man trying to settle in the US with a Visitor's Visa. Featuring Clare Johnson (American), Brendon Mitchell (American), and Albert Kazako (Malawian).

TV series
 Tikuferanji (Why Are We Dying) –  A series that enlightens Malawian about HIV/Aids and encouraging healthy love and sex lives.

Awards
Outstanding Service to youth ministries using theatre – 2008 West Central Africa Division, Nigeria

Work History Timeline
Dr. Manga (Film)
Mangayana in Action (Film)
International Cook (Film)Tikuferanji (Why Are We Dying) (TV Series)Living on Perfume (Film)-2009Watch Out'' (Film)- 2010

References

Living people
Malawian dramatists and playwrights
Malawian male film actors
Malawian male television actors
Malawian politicians
1968 births